Lý Thái Tổ (8 March 974 – 31 March 1028), personal name Lý Công Uẩn, temple name Thái Tổ, was a founding emperor of Lý dynasty and the 6th ruler of Đại Việt; he reigned from 1009 to 1028.

Early years
Lý Công Uẩn was born in Cổ Pháp village, Đình Bảng, Từ Sơn, Bắc Ninh Province in 974. There are few details about his parents and family background as they were not prominently recorded except for the fact that his mother was a woman named Phạm Thị. According to the Vietnamese chronicle, his mother gave him up for adoption to a man named Lý Khánh Vân at the age of three. Công Uẩn was educated by Vạn Hạnh, the most eminent Buddhist patriarch of the time, in the village of Đình Bản, a short distance across the Red River from Hanoi to the northeast. He acquired a reputation as a devout Buddhist, and then a historian student, and a soldier. He was gradually promoted from a minor official to a prominent post of the government and was ultimately bestowed with the title Tả Thân Vệ Điện Tiền Chỉ Huy Sứ (The Commander of the Palace's Left Flank), which was one of the most important positions within the royal guards. 

In 1005, the ruling emperor Lê Hoàn died, resulting in a civil war between his sons. Lý Công Uẩn began serving at the royal court, eventually rising to a high position of trust at the side of the designated heir to the throne. In 1009, the ruling emperor Lê Long Đĩnh (r. 1005–1009), the last emperor of the Lê family, developed hemorrhoids and had to lie down while listening to officials’ reports. Incapacitated by declining health, Long Đĩnh watched helplessly as the monks of Giao launched a propaganda campaign that nurtured belief in the inevitability of Lý Công Uẩn becoming king. He died in November 1009 under the wrath of the people because of his brutality and cruelty during his reign. Đào Cam Mộc, an royal official, and Patriarch Vạn Hạnh seized the opportunity and imposed their power and political influence to enthrone their trusted disciple Lý Công Uẩn without much resistance, thus ended the reign of the Lê dynasty.

Two days after Long Đĩnh's death, advised and assisted by his patron, the monk Vạn Hạnh, and by the efforts of the entire Buddhist establishment, Lý Công Uẩn was proclaimed king by general acclamation. After his ascension to the throne, Lý Công Uẩn named his era "Thuận Thiên" (順天) meaning "Accordance with Heaven['s Will]".

Reign

Capital relocation

The royal court decided to relocate from Hoa Lư to the site of Đại La (modern-day Hanoi) in the next year, 1010. Đại La was known as the city that the Tang general Gao Pian had built in the 860s after the ravages of the Nanzhao War. In 1010, Lý Công Uẩn published an edict explaining why he moved his capital to Dai La. Lý Công Uẩn chose the site because it had been an earlier capital in the rich Red River Delta. He saw Đại La as a place "between Heaven and Earth where the coiling dragon and the crouching tiger lie, and his capital would last 10,000 years". When Lý Công Uẩn's boat docked at the new capital, a dragon, symbol of sovereign authority, reportedly soared above his head; he accordingly renamed the place Thăng Long, the "ascending dragon".

The royal city at Thăng Long was laid out in the standard pattern: the urban center encompassed the Royal City. The Throne Room Palace was located within a Dragon Courtyard and faced south. The Crown Prince of the Lý dynasty lived in the Eastern Palace outside the city walls. Palaces and offices were constructed of timber. Càn Nguyên Palace where the king held audience was located on the Nùng hill. By 1010, 11 palaces were built in Thăng Long. The earthworks which were ramparts of the new capital still stand to the west of the modern city of Hanoi, forming a vast quadrilateral by the side of the road to Sơn Tây.

Domestic policies

The outer regions of the Red River Delta, beyond the Lý heartland, were in the hands of families allied with the Lý family by marriage. Lý Thái Tổ abandoned a scheme of dividing the plain into "ten circuits" that had been devised by Đinh Bộ Lĩnh (r. 968–979) and replaced it with 24 routes; these were not administrative jurisdictions but rather itineraries designating various localities. He organized the southern provinces into military outposts, indicating a policy of garrisons and patrols. Officials did not receive a salary controlled by the capital, but were entirely dependent upon local resources, a region's fish and rice. The soldiers did receive some largesse at the same time as they were expected to do some farming of their own. The village communities scattered about the countryside stayed within their own frames of reference except in times of emergency or of specific royal demands. Only then would they interact with the central power. Otherwise they sent some of their resources to the local lord, who in turn forwarded a share as tribute to the throne. This administrative system resembles a naturally Southeast Asian mandala system.

In 1011, Lý Thái Tổ raised a large army and attacked rebels in the southern provinces, in what is now Thanh Hoá and Nghệ An. He
campaigned there for two years, burning villages and capturing local leaders. While returning by sea in late 1012, a great storm threatened to sink his boat, which he understood as a divine judgment upon him for the violence he had brought upon so many people.

For three years, 1013–1015, Lý Thái Tổ sent soldiers into the northern mountains of modern Hà Giang Province to pacify Hani people who allied with the Dali Kingdom in Yunnan.

He also reformed the tax system in 1013 by creating six tax classifications, which enabled the royal court to efficiently collect taxes and citizens to clearly know which tax classification affected them, for instance, applied mostly to goods produced on royal estates:

 Tax on fishing and seafood production
 Tax on agricultural production (farming)
 Tax on logging/wood and masonry
 Tax on salt production
 Tax on luxury goods production (ivory, gold, silk, precious materials, etc.)
 Tax on fruits and vegetable production

When a severe earthquake occurred in 1016, Lý Thái Tổ prayed to the gods that were in charge of the mountains surrounding the capital, while also sending more than 1,000 people to teach in Buddhist schools. He journeyed around his kingdom both to propitiate its disparate genies and co-opt them by having them "declare" themselves to him.

Foreign affairs

During the reign of Lý Thái Tổ, the Song dynasty was pre-occupied with maintaining internal stability and still recovering from previous defeats or skirmishes with the Liao dynasty and Western Xia. Đại Việt, as a result, was mostly left alone and political relations between the two states revived. In 1010, the Song emperor recognized Lý Công Uẩn without delay, conferring upon him the usual titles of vassalage.

In 1010, Lý Thái Tổ attacked and caught thirteen persons of Địch Lão (bandit) ethnicity and presented the captives to the Chinese court. In August 1014 he sent a mission to China, presented 60 horses as gifts and notified the Song court that he had subdued a Hani community.

Religious activities
Having begun life as a Buddhist monk, Lý Thái Tổ practiced Buddhism and promoted it as the national religion. As a result, he gave much support to the Buddhist clergy and institutions. He donated money to build pagodas throughout Đại Việt. Initially, he built 8 Buddhist temples in the Tiên Du area, heart land of Vietnamese Buddhism and three others around the capital region itself.

Consistent with his geo-administrative vision and his kingship to appease and tame the spirit world, during the eleventh century the Lý court "brought back" to Thăng Long a firmament of local spirits that had long dominated more distant regions of the kingdom. The
spirits of the Trưng sisters from the western delta, the earth genie of Phù Đổng north of the capital, and the Mountain of Bronze Drum god from Thanh Hoá in Ái to the south were all relocated to the capital and housed there in temples specially dedicated to them. If these spirits were "symbols of regional powers", their pacification involved the extension of monarchical authority to the regions of Đại Việt.

In 1024, a temple was built for Lý Thái Tổ to use for reading and reciting the Buddhist scriptures, a copy of which he had requested and
received from the Song court a few years earlier. After establishing suitable relationships with the terrestrial powers, he showed an interest in establishing proper relationships with the supernatural powers, patronizing the Buddhist religion and local cults, thereby cultivating a cultural basis for his authority. Thereafter he began to withdraw from public affairs. In 1025, Vạn Hạnh died. He had been Lý Thái Tổ's teacher, mentor, and, to some extent, father figure. He had previously been an advisor to Lê Hoàn and was a central figure in effecting the transition from the Lê family at Hoa Lư to the Lý family at Thăng Long. It seems that Lý Thái Tổ's royal personality was in some degree animated as an extension of Vạn Hạnh's expectations of him, for from this time little of note is recorded about Lý Thái Tổ until his death in the spring of 1028.

Death

Lý Công Uẩn died in 1028 at the age of 55 according to the royal official accounts. He was buried at Thọ Lăng, the Mausoleum of Longevity, outside of Thiên Đức Palace. He was posthumously named as "Lý Thái Tổ"; his posthumous imperial title was "Thần Võ Hoàng Đế". Today the ancestor spirit of Lý Thái Tổ is among those popularly honoured in rites at national shrines.

Family
 Father
 Hiển Khánh vương (posthumously honored by Lý Thái Tổ in 1010)
 Lý Khánh Vân (adoptive father)
 Mother
 Phạm Thị Ngà
 Brothers
 Dực Thánh Vương (翊聖王)
 Lý Mỗ
 Wives
 Empress Lập Giáo
 Lady Chu Ái Vân (婤爱雲夫人)
 Children
 Lý Phật Mã (李佛瑪)
 Lý Long Bồ (李龍菩) (?–1069)
 Lý Lực 
 Lý Cập
 Lý Phó
 Lý Nhật Quang (李日㫕) (995–1057)
 Princess An Quốc
 Princess Lĩnh Nam (Lý Thị Bảo Hòa)

Ancestry

References

Citations

Bibliography  

 
 
  

  
  
 

 

|- style="text-align: center;"

|-

|-

|-

974 births
1028 deaths
People from Bắc Ninh province
Lý dynasty emperors
Early Lê dynasty generals
Early Lê dynasty officials
11th-century Vietnamese monarchs
Vietnamese monarchs
Founding monarchs